Laurel Mountain may refer to:

Laurel Mountain, in the Forbes State Forest of Pennsylvania
Laurel Mountain, Pennsylvania, a borough near the Pennsylvania mountain
Laurel Mountain Ski Resort, Pennsylvania
Laurel Mountain State Park, Pennsylvania
Laurel Mountain (West Virginia), West Virginia
Laurel Mountain (California)
Laurel Mountain (Oregon)
Laurel Mountain Elementary School, Austin, Texas
A former name of the Cumberland Mountains

See also
Mountain laurel (disambiguation), several flowering plants